Jean-Yves Rey (born November 24, 1970) is a Swiss ski mountaineer and long-distance runner.

Rey was born in Sierre. He started ski mountaineering in 1990, competing first in the Patrouille des Glaciers short-distance race. He was a member of the national team from 1999 to 2006.

Selected results

Ski mountaineering 
 1998:
 1st, Patrouille de la Maya A-course, together with Gabriel Besson and Jean-Daniel Masserey
 1999:
 7th, Pierra Menta, together with Jean-Daniel Masserey
 2000:
 1st, Patrouille de la Maya A-course, together with Pierre-Marie Taramarcaz and Jean-Daniel Masserey
 2003:
 6th, European Championship team race (together with Jean-Daniel Masserey)
 2004:
 1st, Patrouille de la Maya A-course, together with Sébastien Epiney and Jean-Daniel Masserey
 2nd, Trophée des Gastlosen, together with Jean-Daniel Masserey
 4th, World Championship team race (together with Sébastien Epiney)
 9th, World Championship vertical race
 2005:
 2nd, European Championship relay race (together with Alexander Hug, Christian Pittex and Yannick Ecoeur)
 7th, European Championship single race
 7th, European Championship team race (together with Jean-Daniel Masserey)
 2008:
 1st, Patrouille de la Maya A-course, together with Pierre-Marie Taramarcaz and Jean-Daniel Masserey
 2009:
 2nd, Trophée des Gastlosen, together with Pierre-Marie Taramarcaz

Patrouille des Glaciers 

 1998: 3rd (international military teams ranking), together with Jean-Daniel Masserey and Gabriel Besson
 2000: 2nd (and 1st in "seniors I" class ranking), together with Pierre-Marie Taramarcaz and Jean-Daniel Masserey
 2002: 2nd, together with Pierre-Marie Taramarcaz and Jean-Daniel Masserey
 2004: 2nd, together with Pierre-Marie Taramarcaz and Jean-Daniel Masserey
 2008: 2nd, together with Pierre-Marie Taramarcaz and Jean-Daniel Masserey
 2010: 3rd, together with Jean-Daniel Masserey and Rico Elmer

Running 
 2001: 3rd, Jeizibärg-Lauf, Gampel
 2003: 3rd, Jeizibärg-Lauf, Gampel

Rey won the Zermatt marathon in 2004, the Mont-Blanc marathon in 2008, as well as three times in a row the AlpenMarathon – Marathon des Alpages, where he has held the course record with a total time of 3:07:18 hours since 2005.

External links 
 Jean-Yves Rey at Skimountaineering.org

References 

1970 births
Living people
Swiss male ski mountaineers
Swiss military patrol (sport) runners
Swiss male long-distance runners
Swiss mountain runners
People from Sierre
Sportspeople from Valais